The Black Roses is a professional football club based in American Samoa. The Black Roses plays in the FFAS Senior League the top flight of American Samoan football. The club has won one league title in the FFAS Senior League in 2009.

Squad
2022 Squad

Titles
FFAS Senior League (1):
2009

References

Football clubs in American Samoa